Civic Force (FC) was a political party in Romania. It was founded in 2004 by former Mayor of Bucharest Viorel Lis (formerly affiliated with the Christian Democratic National Peasants' Party or PNȚ-CD throughout his term). Its last president was former Prime Minister Mihai Răzvan Ungureanu, elected at the September 2012 party congress until 2014 when the party was absorbed by the Democratic Liberal Party (PDL).

History 

Civic Force (FC) was founded in 2004 by former Bucharest mayor, Viorel Lis (who was previously a member of the Christian Democratic National Peasants' Party), under the name 'Christian Party'. In 2007, Adrian Iurașcu became the president of the party, after which the party adopted its current name. In 2009, FC ran for the European Parliament elections of that year, but failed to win any seats.

In 2012, former Prime Minister Mihai Răzvan Ungureanu was elected president. For the 2012 parliamentary elections, FC joined the Right Romania Alliance (ARD), an electoral alliance with other center-right opposition parties: Democratic Liberal Party (PDL) and Christian Democratic National Peasants' Party (PNȚ-CD). Furthermore, the party also applied to become a member of the European People's Party (EPP). Through ARD's list during the legislative election held in that year, FC gained three deputy seats (more specifically Dan Cristian Popescu, Dănuț Culețu, and Cristian Roman) and a senator seat (namely party president Mihai Răzvan Ungureanu). Eventually, in July 2014, the Civic Force was absorbed by the Democratic Liberal Party (PDL).

Notable members 

 Mihai Răzvan Ungureanu – president of Civic Force, senator 2012–2015, Prime Minister 2012, Minister of Foreign Affairs 2004–2007, former PNL member 2004–2007;
 Adrian Iurașcu – prime-vice-president of Civic Force, president of Civic Force 2007–2012, leader of CDR elected from civil society 1996–2000;
 Dan Cristian Popescu – vice-president of Civic Force, deputy 2012–present, president of PNL Sector 1 2007–2012 (expelled from PNL in 2012);
 Dănuț Culețu – president of Civic Force Constanța, deputy 2012–present, prefect of Constanța 2005–2009 (left PNL in 2010).

Electoral history

Legislative elections 

Notes:

1 Right Romania Alliance (ARD) members: PDL (22 senators and 52 deputies), Civic Force, and PNȚ-CD (1 senator and 1 deputy).

European elections

References 

2008 establishments in Romania
2014 disestablishments in Romania
Political parties established in 2008
Political parties disestablished in 2014
Defunct political parties in Romania
Conservative parties in Romania
Christian democratic parties in Europe